William John Luff (15 January 1886 – 6 September 1952) was an Australian rules footballer who played with the Richmond in the Victorian Football League (VFL).

Family
The son of Richmond City Councillor, Charles Osborne Luff (1851-1922), and Charlotte Luff (1854-1943), née Entwhistle, William John Luff was born on 15 January 1886.

He married Sarah Ross (1888-1976) in 1909. Their son, William Norman Charles Luff, a.k.a. "Bill Luff" played with Camberwell in the VFA and, then, with Essendon in the VFL.

He died on 6 September 1952.

Football 
He was a "tall, lightly-built" half-back flanker, "who was a fine high mark [and] possessed sound judgement and a good football brain".

Richmond (VFA)
Along with his brother Jim, Luff played for Richmond in the VFA competition from 1905 to 1907.

Richmond (VFL)
Richmond entered the VFL competition in 1908; and Luff played with 39 senior games for Richmond over three seasons (1908-1910). He was the first Richmond (VFL) footballer to represent Victoria — he played three games for Victoria in the Jubilee Australasian Football Carnival of 1908.

Prahran (VFA) 
He transferred to Prahran in 1911.

Beverley (MAFA)
In 1914, he was cleared from Prahran to the Beverley Football Club, in the Metropolitan Amateur Football Association.

See also 
 1908 Melbourne Carnival

Footnotes

References 
 Hogan P: The Tigers Of Old, Richmond FC, (Melbourne), 1996. 
 Holmesby, R. & Main, J., The Encyclopedia of AFL Footballers: every AFL/VFL player since 1897 (Tenth Edition), BAS Publishing, (Seaford, Victoria), 2014.

External links 

		

1886 births
1952 deaths
Australian rules footballers from Melbourne
Richmond Football Club players
People from Hawthorn, Victoria